Lincoln Constance (February 16, 1909 – June 11, 2001) was an American botanist and administrator at the University of California, Berkeley. Constance worked with Marion S. Cave for over twenty years to identify how many chromosomes different members of Hydrophyllaceae had.  An expert on the parsley family, he was a fellow of the American Academy of Arts and Sciences and the California Academy of Sciences, and served as president of the American Society of Plant Taxonomists, the California Botanical Society and the Botanical Society of America.

References

External links

American taxonomists
1909 births
2001 deaths
Botanists active in California
Fellows of the American Academy of Arts and Sciences
People associated with the California Academy of Sciences
UC Berkeley College of Chemistry faculty
Botanical Society of America
Scientists from the San Francisco Bay Area
20th-century American botanists
Members of the Royal Swedish Academy of Sciences